Bechari Mehrunnisa is a Pakistani television soap opera which aired on Geo Entertainment. First episode was aired on 29 November 2016. Serial stars Sukaina Khan, Jahanzeb Khan and Farah Shah. Soap aired throughout week days with half an hour episode.

Cast
Sukaina Khan as Mehrunnisa 
Anumta Qureshi as Humera	
Esha Noor as Sanam
Mariya Khan as Nudrat
Mizna Waqas as Sarah
Jahanzeb Khan
Farah Shah
Kanwar Arsalan
Saleem Iqbal
Shazia Gohar
Maryam Tiwana
Javed Jamal
Isha Butt
Sami ur Rehman

References

Pakistani television soap operas
2016 Pakistani television series debuts
Urdu-language television shows